Emperador is a municipality in the comarca of Horta Nord in the Valencian Community, Spain. It is the second smallest municipality in all Spain, covering just . It has 306 inhabitants as of 2006. In Valencian it's called "Emperador" or "Venta de l'Emperador" or just "la Venta".

References

Municipalities in the Province of Valencia
Horta Nord
Enclaves and exclaves